This page compares software with specific support for the scrum framework. Although the features of some general project management software can be conceptualized around scrum, general project management software is not included on this list unless it has, or a plugin for it has, specific support for scrum.

General information

Sprint features

Story features

Task features

Integration features

See also 
 Comparison of project management software
 Kanban (development)

Notes and references

Notes

References 

Scrum software, comparison of
Scrum